Reaching for the Stars may refer to:

 Reaching for the Stars (film), a 1955 West German drama film
 "Reaching For The Stars" (song), a 2012 song by Will.i.am
 Reaching for the Stars (TV series), a 2005 Taiwanese drama
 Reaching for the Stars (soundtrack)